Alfred Kronig (8 November 1928 – 28 April 2020) was a Swiss cross-country skier who competed in the 1950s. He finished 30th in the 18 km event at the 1952 Winter Olympics in Oslo. He also competed at the 1956 Winter Olympics.

References

External links
18 km Olympic cross country results: 1948-52
Alfred Kronig's obituary 

1928 births
2020 deaths
Olympic cross-country skiers of Switzerland
Cross-country skiers at the 1952 Winter Olympics
Cross-country skiers at the 1956 Winter Olympics
Swiss male cross-country skiers